"DJ" is a song by Danish pop band Alphabeat, released as the second single from their second studio album, The Spell (2009). The song peaked at number six on the Danish Singles Chart, and was certified gold by IFPI Denmark on 20 April 2010 for sales in excess of 15,000 copies.

In the United Kingdom, "DJ" was released in May 2010 as the third single from the international version of the album, The Beat Is... The track was remixed by Biffco and promoted as "DJ (I Could Be Dancing)" for the single release.

Track listings
Danish digital single
"DJ" – 3:17

UK CD single
"DJ (I Could Be Dancing)" (Biffco Single Edit) – 3:13
"DJ (I Could Be Dancing)" (Doman & Gooding Radio Edit) – 3:00
"DJ (I Could Be Dancing)" (Fascination Edit) – 3:43

UK 12" single
A. "DJ (I Could Be Dancing)" (Biffco 12" Mix) – 5:12
B. "DJ (I Could Be Dancing)" (Doman & Gooding Remix) – 4:56

UK digital EP
"DJ (I Could Be Dancing)" (Radio Mix) – 3:11
"DJ (I Could Be Dancing)" (Fascination Remix) – 7:36
"DJ (I Could Be Dancing)" (Doman & Gooding Club Mix) – 4:55
"DJ (I Could Be Dancing)" (Biffco Extended Mix) – 5:11
"DJ (I Could Be Dancing)" (Ian Masterson 12" Remix) – 7:14

Charts

Weekly charts

Year-end charts

Certifications

Release history

References

2009 songs
2010 singles
Alphabeat songs
Copenhagen Records singles